Qiaodong District is a district and the seat of the city of Zhangjiakou, Hebei province, China.

Administrative divisions

Subdistricts:
Hongqilou Subdistrict, North Shengli Road Subdistrict, Wuyi Road Subdistrict, Huayuan Avenue Subdistrict, Zuanshi Road Subdistrict, Nanzhan Subdistrict, Maludong Subdistrict

At the time of the 2010 census, the district had a population of 339,372.

Towns:
Laoyazhuang Town, Yaojiazhuang Town, Dacanggai Town

Townships:
Dongwangshan Township

References

External links

County-level divisions of Hebei
Zhangjiakou